Blackmagic Design Pty Ltd. is an Australian digital cinema company and hardware manufacturer based in Port Melbourne, Victoria, Australia. It designs and manufactures broadcast and cinema hardware, most notably high-end digital-movie cameras, and also develops video editing software, such as the DaVinci Resolve and Blackmagic Fusion applications.

History 
The company was founded in 2001 by Grant Petty and produced its first product, a capture card for macOS called DeckLink that was the first to offer uncompressed 10-bit video, in 2002. The company later released newer versions of the product and added color-correction capabilities, support for Windows, and full support for Adobe Premiere Pro and Microsoft DirectShow.

In 2005 the company released several products, including the Multibridge family of PCIe bi-directional converters and the FrameLink family of DPX-based software.
In 2006 the company released Blackmagic On-Air television production software.
In 2009 the company acquired the American based Da Vinci Systems, best known for its color-correction and color-grading products.
In 2010 the company acquired the intellectual property of Echolab and the ATEM line of production video switchers.
At the 2012 NAB Show Blackmagic announced its first Cinema Camera. 
In 2014 the company acquired eyeon Software Inc, known for the Blackmagic Fusion compositing software.
In 2014 the company acquired Cintel, the film scanning and preservation company, which has its roots as the Baird Television Company, founded by John Logie Baird in 1927.
In September 2016 the company acquired Fairlight.
In 2018, Blackmagic became a participant in Netflix's all four categories for its Post Technology Alliance which includes both URSA cinema cameras and DaVinci Resolve. In the same year, Blackmagic Design also partnered with Apple to create the Blackmagic eGPU which was sold exclusively through the Apple Store for the first 6 months upon release. This was followed by the Blackmagic eGPU Pro which was also solely sold through the Apple Store.

Products 
List of all products developed by the company.

Digital Film Cameras
Micro Cinema Camera
Cinema Camera 2.5K & 4K
Pocket Cinema Camera 1080p, 4K, 6K (first and second generations), and 6K Pro
URSA Mini Pro 4.6K G2, and 12K

Live Production Cameras
Micro Studio Camera 4K
Studio Camera HD and 4K
Blackmagic Studio Camera 4K Plus, and Blackmagic Studio Camera 4K Pro
URSA Broadcast
URSA Broadcast G2

Editing, Color Correction and Audio Post Production
DaVinci Resolve (free version) and DaVinci Resolve Studio (paid version)
Blackmagic Fusion Studio (Visual Effects, VR, 3D and Broadcast Graphics)
Audio/Video Controller Consoles (Editor Keyboard, Speed Editor, Micro Panel, Mini Panel, Advanced Panel, Fairlight Console Channel Fader, Fairlight Console Channel Control, Fairlight Console LCD Monitor, Fairlight Console Audio Editor, Fairlight Desktop Audio Editor, Fairlight Desktop Console, Fairlight Audio Interface)
Cintel Film Scanner

Live Production
Home Streaming: ATEM Mini, ATEM Mini Pro/ISO, ATEM Mini Extreme, ATEM Mini Extreme ISO
TV Studios: ATEM Television Studio Pro 4K, ATEM Camera Control Panel, ATEM 1 M/E Advanced Panel, ATEM 2 M/E Advanced Panel, ATEM 4 M/E Advanced Panel, ATEM Production Studio 4K, ATEM 1 M/E Production Studio 4K, ATEM 2 M/E Production Studio 4K, ATEM 4 M/E Broadcast Studio 4K, ATEM Constellation 8K
Recording and Storage: HyperDeck Studio 12G, HyperDeck Studio Pro, Duplicator 4K, MultiDock 10G, HyperDeck Extreme 8K HDR, Video Assist 7” 12G HDR

Capture and Playback
UltraStudio HD Mini
UltraStudio 4K Mini
UltraStudio 4K Extreme 3
DeckLink (PCIe cards): Mini Recorder, Mini Monitor, Mini Monitor 4K, Mini Recorder 4K, Duo 2 Mini, Duo 2, Quad 2, SDI 4K, Studio 4K, 4K Extreme 12G, 8K Pro, Quad HDMI Recorder

Network Storage
Cloud Store: 20TB, 80TB, 320TB (Built to order)
Cloud Store Mini: 8TB
Cloud Pod

Broadcast Converters
Micro Converter: BiDirectional SDI/HDMI 3G wPSU, HDMI to SDI 3G wPSU, SDI to HDMI 3G wPSU, BiDirectional SDI/HDMI 3G, HDMI to SDI 3G, SDI to HDMI 3G
Mini Converters: Audio to SDI, Optical Fiber 12G, SDI Multiplex 4K, Quad SDI to HDMI 4K, SDI Distribution 4K, SDI to Analog 4K, Audio to SDI 4K, SDI to Audio 4K, HDMI to SDI 6G, SDI to HDMI 6G
Teranex Mini: SDI Distribution 12G, SDI to HDMI 12G, Audio to SDI 12G, SDI to Analog 12G, SDI to HDMI 8K HDR, SDI to DisplayPort 8K HDR

See also 
DaVinci Resolve
Digital cinema
History of film technology
List of digital camera brands

References

External links

Official website

Australian brands
Electronics companies of Australia
Manufacturing companies based in Melbourne
Movie camera manufacturers
Technology companies of Australia
Video equipment manufacturers
Video editing software